Bhaid is a Pakistani television show, focusing on Infotainment. The show airs on the news channel, Express News. The show airs every Tuesday from 19:30-20:30 PST and is hosted by Mohsin Ahmad.

Concept
Bhaid revolves around unexplained stories which are explained through scientific advancement, religious mythology, history, research and investigations. Research and Script by Imran Shamshad Narmi & Hosted by Mohsin Ahmad, the show is a series of documentaries based over myths and mysteries giving out versions of people belonging to different school of thoughts like philosophy, sciences, religion etc.

Credits
 Mohsin Ahmad - Producer, Director and Presenter
 Imran Shamshad Narmi - Researcher & Script Writer
 Rasheed Ahmed - Snr. Producer
 Sajid saleem, Ashfaq Ahmed, Faraz Abedi - Associate producer(s)

References

External links
 

Pakistani television series